The Arnet Pereyra Sabre II is an American, two-seats in side-by-side configuration, conventional landing gear-equipped, strut-braced, high-wing ultralight trainer that was produced by Arnet Pereyra Inc of Rockledge, Florida in kit form for amateur construction.

Design and development
First flown in July 1992, the Sabre II is a land version of the highly successful 1984-vintage Arnet Pereyra Buccaneer, which the company produced at the same time. The lower fuselage was more streamlined than the boat-hull and was lighter as well.

The Sabre is constructed from bolted aluminium tubing, covered in pre-sewn Dacron sailcloth envelopes. Standard aircraft dope and fabric is optional. When in production a Ballistic Recovery Systems parachute was standard.

The Sabre II was not a commercial success, with only three reported delivered by 2001 and the aircraft was dropped from the company line when the company was renamed Aero Adventure Aviation circa 2003.

Specifications (version)

References

1990s United States ultralight aircraft
Sabre